These are things named after Erich Hecke, a German mathematician.

 Hecke algebra
Hecke algebra of a locally compact group
Hecke algebra of a finite group
Hecke algebra of a pair
Hecke polynomial
Iwahori–Hecke algebra
 Affine Hecke algebra
Double affine Hecke algebra
 Hecke algebra (disambiguation)
 Hecke character
 Hecke congruence subgroup
 Hecke correspondence
 Hecke eigenform
 Hecke group
 Hecke L-function (disambiguation)
 Hecke operator
 Hecke ring

Hecke